The 1954–55 Michigan Wolverines men's basketball team represented the University of Michigan in intercollegiate basketball during the 1954–55 season.  The team finished the season in a tie for 6th place in the Big Ten Conference with an overall record of 11–11 and 5–9 against conference opponents.

William Perigo was in his third year as the team's head coach. Sophomore Ron Kramer was the team's leading scorer with 352 points in 22 games for an average of 16.0 points per game.  Paul Groffsky was the team captain.  Two members of the team went on to play as a professional in sports other than basketball.  Kramer played in the National Football League, and Don Eaddy played Major League Baseball.

Statistical leaders

Team players drafted into the NBA
One player from this team were selected in the NBA Draft.

References

Michigan
Michigan Wolverines men's basketball seasons
Michigan Wolverines basketball
Michigan Wolverines basketball